Thioacetone is an organosulfur compound belonging to the -thione group called thioketones, with a chemical formula (CH3)2CS. It is an unstable orange or brown substance that can be isolated only at low temperatures. Above , thioacetone readily converts to a polymer and a trimer, trithioacetone. It has an extremely potent, unpleasant odor, and is considered one of the worst-smelling chemicals known to man.

Thioacetone was first obtained in 1889 by Baumann and Fromm, as a minor impurity in their synthesis of trithioacetone.

Preparation
Thioacetone is usually obtained by cracking the cyclic trimer trithioacetone, [(CH3)2CS]3. The trimer is prepared by pyrolysis of allyl isopropyl sulfide or by treating acetone with hydrogen sulfide in the presence of a Lewis acid.

Polymerization
Unlike its oxygen analogue acetone, which does not polymerise easily, thioacetone spontaneously polymerizes even at very low temperatures, pure or dissolved in ether or ethylene oxide, yielding a white solid that is a varying mixture of a linear polymer  and the cyclic trimer trithioacetone. Infrared absorption of this product occurs mainly at 2950, 2900, 1440, 1150, 1360, and 1375 cm−1 due to the geminal methyl pairs, and at 1085 and 643 cm−1 due to the C–S bond. The 1H NMR spectra shows a single peak at x = 8.1.

The mean molecular weight of the polymer varies from 2000 to 14000 depending on the preparation method, temperature, and presence of the thioenol tautomer. The polymer melts in the range of about 70 °C to 125 °C. Polymerization is promoted by free radicals and light.

It also has a disagreeable odor.

Odor
Thioacetone has an intensely foul odour.  Like many low molecular weight organosulfur compounds, the smell is potent and can be detected even when highly diluted.  In 1889, an attempt to distill the chemical in the German city of Freiburg was followed by cases of vomiting, nausea and unconsciousness in an area with a radius of  around the laboratory due to the smell. In an 1890 report, British chemists at the Whitehall Soap Works in Leeds noted that dilution seemed to make the smell worse and described the smell as "fearful".
Thioacetone is considered a dangerous chemical due to its extremely foul odor and ability to render people unconscious, induce vomiting, and be detected over long distances.

In 1967, Esso researchers repeated the experiment of cracking trithioacetone, at a laboratory south of Oxford, UK. They reported their experience as follows:

See also
 Thiobenzophenone, a thioketone that can be isolated as a solid
 Bromoacetone
 Chloroacetone
 Fluoroacetone
 Iodoacetone

References

External links
 Thioacetone, NIST
 Trithioacetone, Aldrich

Thioketones
Foul-smelling chemicals